These are the Billboard magazine number-one albums of 1997, per the Billboard 200.

Chart history

See also
1997 in music
List of number-one albums (United States)

References

1997
1997 record charts